Elizabeth K. Ralph (1921–1993) was a pioneer in the development and application of radiocarbon dating techniques to archeology, as well as a long-time member of the U.S. women's field hockey team.  In the Radiocarbon Laboratory at the University of Pennsylvania, and later in the Museum Applied Science Center for Archaeology (MASCA) in the Penn Museum, Ralph developed methods for dendrochronology, or tree-ring dating, and thermoluminescence for dating ceramics.  She also improved instruments for the measurement of magnetic intensity, including cesium magnetometers, which located landscape anomalies that could signal the presence of archaeological sites.  In the 1960s, she used these instruments to help locate the Archaic Greek site of Sybaris in southern Italy.  She went on to analyze and date materials from dozens of archaeological sites in several countries.  She published her research in journals including Science and Nature, and with her colleague H.N. Michael, published a textbook entitled Dating Techniques for the Archaeologist, which appeared from MIT Press in 1971.  From 1962 to 1982 she served as associate director of MASCA lab, which she helped to establish with support from the National Science Foundation.

Education and career 

Elizabeth Katherine Ralph was born and raised in New Jersey.  She earned her bachelor's degree in chemistry from Wellesley College in 1942.  She became a junior electronic engineer at Foote, Pierson, & Co in New Jersey where she became an assistant to the chief radio engineer and later a project engineer.  She later moved to a similar job at Kearfott Manufacturing Company in Newark, New Jersey.

In 1949, Ralph enrolled in a master's degree program in Physics at the University of Pennsylvania.  In 1951, she interned in the laboratory of Nobel laureate Willard Libby at the University of Chicago, where she learned radiocarbon techniques.  In 1951, as well, the Penn Museum hired her to perform analyses in a Carbon-14 laboratory that she helped to establish.

In Penn's Radiocarbon Lab, Ralph conducted her first analysis of museum materials on a set of human bones from the Hotu Cave in Iran, which Carleton S. Coon excavated between 1949 and 1951.  In an account of this research which she published in the journal Science in 1955, Ralph listed herself as an affiliate of both the Museum and the Department of Physics of the University of Pennsylvania, and expressed thanks to Gaylord Harnwell (Penn's president, and a nuclear physicist), and Froehlich Rainey (the Penn Museum's director, and an anthropologist), for their support in establishing the lab.

Ralph's work expanded in 1962 when she became associate director of the Museum Applied Science Center for Archaeology (MASCA), which was established in the Penn Museum with funding from the National Science Foundation.  According to a museum spokesperson who commented on her accomplishments after her death, her work in the MASCA lab kept her so busy that she did not finish her PhD in geology from Penn until 1973.

Ralph was an avid field hockey player and competed for many years on the United States Women's National Field Hockey Team.  Robert H. Dyson, director of the Penn Museum known for his excavations at the Neolithic site of Hasanlu in Iran, later recalled that she competed in field hockey tournaments throughout most of her career.  Henry N. Michael, with whom she co-authored the book Dating Techniques for the Archaeologist (1911), described her work excavating in southern Italy, in the 1960s, as “legendary” because she had to walk hundreds of miles across archaeological sites with the improved cesium magnetometers that she devised.  She showed a degree of stamina that Michael attributed to her membership in the U.S. women's field hockey team, which often competed internationally.

Research and distinctions 

With her colleague Henry N. Michael, a professor at Temple University and a fellow Penn PhD who worked closely with her in the MASCA lab, Ralph developed research on dendrochronology.  As a New York Times obituary of Michael observed, they use pine trees as "living calendars", analyzing tree rings with radiocarbon testing in order to date materials in ways that benefitted archaeologists and other scientists.

Ralph analyzed items from more than fifty sites in eight countries.  For example, she worked on Early Jomon materials from Hokkaido, Japan and Mayan materials from Tikal in Guatemala.  She analyzed samples from the Arctic and from Afghanistan.  Her contributions to radiocarbon dating included breakthroughs in calibration and the “radiocarbon calendar”.  She also traveled to archaeological sites in Canada, Mexico, the United Kingdom, Yugoslavia, Turkey and Egypt to supervise the use of MASCA's carbon-dating instruments in situ.

Elizabeth Ralph retired from MASCA and Penn in 1982.  In 1986, she received the Pomerance Award of the Archaeological Institute of America in recognition of her outstanding contributions to archaeology through science. The Archaeological Institute of America cited Ralph for many publications and achievements, including her leading roles in developing the half-life mode of radiocarbon dating; recognizing the need for a correction factor in this process; and testing instruments for sub-surface excavation as first demonstrated in her work at Sybaris.

Death and legacies 

Elizabeth Ralph died in Trenton, New Jersey in 1993. The archives of the Penn Museum preserve many of her papers within the “MASCA: Froelich Rainey and Elizabeth Ralph Records.”

References

1921 births
1993 deaths
People from New Jersey
Wellesley College alumni
University of Pennsylvania Museum of Archaeology and Anthropology
University of Pennsylvania alumni
American female field hockey players
American women physicists
American women geologists
American women chemists
20th-century American archaeologists
20th-century American women
University of Chicago staff